The 2017 Mercer Bears football team represented Mercer University as a member the Southern Conference (SoCon) during the 2017 NCAA Division I FCS football season. They were led by fifth-year head coach Bobby Lamb and played their home games at the Moye Complex in Macon, Georgia. Mercer finished the season 5–6 overall and 4–4 in SoCon play to place fifth.

Schedule

References

Mercer
Mercer Bears football seasons
Mercer Bears football